Mark Jones (born 26 September 1961) is an English former professional footballer. During his career, he made over 200 appearances in the Football League during spells with Oxford United, Swindon Town and Cardiff City.

Career
Born in Berinsfield, Jones began his career with his hometown club Oxford United where he was part of the side that won consecutive promotions to help the side reach the First Division. He joined Swindon Town in October 1986 for £30,000, again winning promotion to the Second Division in his first season. However, persistent injury problems resulted in a move to Cardiff City in the Fourth Division but, struggling to overcome his injuries, he was eventually released in May 1992.

References

1961 births
Living people
English footballers
Association football midfielders
Oxford United F.C. players
Swindon Town F.C. players
Cardiff City F.C. players
English Football League players